Josiah Howell Bagster (19 February 1847 – 17 October 1893) was a land agent and politician in the British colony of South Australia. He was generally referred to by his full name or as Josiah H. Bagster or J. H. Bagster, perhaps to differentiate him from his father, Josiah Shirley Bagster.

History
Bagster was born in Ledbury, Herefordshire and baptised Joseph Howell Bagster in Ledbury parish church on 1 March 1847, the son of stationer Josiah Shirley Bagster (c. 1811 – 6 March 1882) and his wife Elizabeth née Howell, who emigrated to South Australia on the Caroline, arriving in September 1849. His father was born on 10 July 1811 and baptised on 08 January 1812, at Partridge Lane Independent Church, Faversham, Kent, England. He married Elizabeth Howell at St James Church, Westminster, London in the second quarter of 1841, but had arrived in Ledbury before the 1841 census which was conducted on 6 June 1841.
At some stage he took his father's name Josiah, rather than the more usual Joseph, which he was baptised. He attended Webster's Commercial School in Grenfell Street, Adelaide, and was apprenticed to the Government Printing Office. He abandoned the printing trade for land dealing.

He was on the boards of several public companies and the Zoological Society and acted as Director of the Zoological Gardens during the absence of R. E. Minchin. He also sat on the Adelaide Licensing Bench and the Central Road Board.

He was mayor of Unley from 1877 to 1878.

He was member for Yatala in the House of Assembly from September 1881 to April 1890.

One commentator described him as able and amiable, but devoid of ideas and lacking forcefulness in speech. He made and lost a fortune and was financially saved by a lucky draw in a Melbourne Cup sweep. He died after an operation for an ulcerated lung.

Family
J. H. Bagster married Eleanor Winzor (13 December 1849 – 7 February 1884) on 31 December 1872. Their children included:
Winifred Bagster (19 November 1873 – )
son Shirley Winzor Bagster (29 April 1875 – 26 August 1932) married Hannah Mabel Slatter ( – ) on 7 July 1909
Geraldine Bagster (12 January 1878 – 16 January 1883)

He married again, to Mary Ann Harvey (1 November 1847 – 28 May 1931) on 22 April 1885 and lived at Mary Street, Unley. Mary Ann was a daughter of fellow MHA John Harvey.
Lancelot Salisbury Bagster (9 August 1886 – 14 March 1940)
Mabel Gwendoline Bagster (27 March 1888 – )

References 

Members of the South Australian House of Assembly
Australian real estate agents
1847 births
1893 deaths
19th-century Australian politicians
19th-century Australian businesspeople